van Onselen is a Dutch surname. Notable people with the surname include:

 Charles van Onselen, South African historian
 Peter van Onselen (born 1976), Australian academic

Afrikaans-language surnames
Surnames of Dutch origin